Yuriy Bilonoh (also romanized as Yuriy Bilonog; born March 9, 1974) is a Ukrainian shot putter.

Biography
Born in Bilopillia, Sumy Oblast, he began athletics at a Children and Youth Sports School in Bilopillia, where his first trainer was Vladimir Belikov.

Bilonoh was initially awarded a gold medal at the 2004 Olympic Games, but this medal was withdrawn in 2012 as a result of an anti-doping case.

Achievements

References

External links
 
 

1974 births
Living people
Ukrainian male shot putters
Ukrainian male discus throwers
Athletes (track and field) at the 2000 Summer Olympics
Athletes (track and field) at the 2004 Summer Olympics
Athletes (track and field) at the 2008 Summer Olympics
Olympic athletes of Ukraine
World Athletics Championships medalists
Doping cases in athletics
Ukrainian sportspeople in doping cases
Competitors stripped of Summer Olympics medals
European Athletics Championships medalists
European champions for Ukraine
Universiade medalists in athletics (track and field)
Universiade gold medalists for Ukraine
Universiade silver medalists for Ukraine
World Athletics Indoor Championships winners
Medalists at the 1997 Summer Universiade
Medalists at the 2001 Summer Universiade
K. D. Ushinsky South Ukrainian National Pedagogical University alumni
Sportspeople from Sumy Oblast